A remix is an alternative version of a recorded work.

Remix or The Remix may also refer to:

Film and television 
 Remix (film), a 2008 Danish film
 The Remix: Hip Hop X Fashion, a 2019 American documentary film
 Remix (TV series), a 2004–2006 Indian teen drama series
 Remix (Arabic TV series), a musical series featuring Hamza Namira
 The Remix (TV series), a 2018 Indian music reality competition series
 "Remix" (Good Girls), a television episode

Literature and periodicals
 Remix (book), a 2008 book by Lawrence Lessig
 Remix (magazine), a defunct American music magazine
 Remix (fashion magazine), a New Zealand magazine
 reMix, a 1999 novel by Jon Courtenay Grimwood
 Remix, a Malaysian entertainment magazine

Music 
 Remix (Candan Erçetin album), 2003
 Remix (Le Tigre album), 2003
 Remix (Mushroomhead album), 1997
 Remix (William Control album), 2014
 r.e.m.IX, an album by R.E.M., 2002
 Remix, an EP by Sam Smith, 2020
 The Remix (Lady Gaga album), 2010
 The Remix (Ariana Grande album), 2015
 "Remix (I Like The)", a song by New Kids on the Block, 2013
 "Remix", a song by Daddy Yankee from the album Legendaddy, 2022

Technology 
 re-mix, an open-source library to bring mixin to C# and Visual Basic.NET
 Remix 3D, a Microsoft website for browsing, distributing, and downloading 3D objects
 Remix Fuel, an alternative nuclear fuel developed in Russia
 Remix OS, an Android-based computer operating system for x86 architecture
 Remix, an integrated development environment for Solidity

See also 
 
 
 
 Arrangement, a musical reconceptualization of a previously composed work
 :Category:Remix albums
 OverClocked ReMix, a website which hosts video game musical arrangements
 Remixes (disambiguation)
 The Remix Album (disambiguation)
 The Remix Collection (disambiguation)
 The Remixes (disambiguation)